The A16 road is a principal road of Lincolnshire in the East Midlands region of England, connecting the port of Grimsby and Peterborough, where it meets the A1175, A47 & A1139 then on to the A1 and the A605; the latter, in turn, giving a through route to Northampton and the west, and south west of England. The road was "de-trunked", with responsibility largely returned to Lincolnshire County Council from the Highways Agency in 2002.

Settlements on route
From north to south its route is:
Grimsby
Utterby
Louth (now bypassed)
Burwell
Walmsgate
Dalby
Partney (now bypassed)
Spilsby
East Keal
Keal Cotes
Stickford (now bypassed)
Stickney
Sibsey
Hilldyke
Boston
Wyberton (now bypassed)
Kirton (now bypassed)
Surfleet (now bypassed)
Pinchbeck (now bypassed)
Spalding (now bypassed)
Crowland (bypassed)
Peterborough

The road is a Primary Route for its entire length.
Most of the A16 is single carriageway.

History

Ludborough Bypass opening
The  £1.2 million Ludborough Bypass opened in November 1992.

Fotherby Bypass opening
The  Fotherby Bypass opened in 2004.

Louth Bypass opening
 £6.6 million Louth Bypass opened in August 1991.

Partney Bypass opening
The  Partney Bypass opened in August 2005.

Stickford Bypass opening
The  £1 million Stickford Bypass opened in October 1992.

Boston Inner Relief Road opening
The £1.4 million Boston Inner Relief Road opened in early 1978.

Boston-Algarkirk Diversion opening
The  £11.5 million Boston-Algarkirk Diversion opened in October 1991.

Spalding Bypass opening
The  £23 million Spalding-Sutterton Improvement (the Spalding Bypass) opened in August 1995.

Junction list

Future

Boston Distributor Road
There are demands for Boston to be bypassed. Therefore, Lincolnshire County Council have 'safeguarded' the corridor for the Boston Distributor Road.

Incidents
There are multiple crashes on the A16, especially near Louth.

Spalding-Peterborough route change

Old route of the A16
The route of the A16 changed following the completion of the new Spalding-Peterborough link road. The section between Spalding to the south of Crowland only, opened in August 2010; the remainder was completed in October 2011. The new route has taken the number A16, effectively linking the route with Peterborough, with the current road from Spalding to Stamford becoming the A1175.

A1073 road

The A1073 route had become increasingly dangerous over the years because traffic usage had increased. It was narrow with many blind corners and slopes, and much of it was on an embankment with deep ditches either side and no run-off areas. There were dangerous junctions, particularly with the B1443 between Peakirk and Thorney, which formed a staggered crossroads. The road was a principal route servicing the food-processing industry in Spalding, bringing in supplies and moving products to the supermarket distribution system to the south.

An upgrade to the route had been under discussion for many years. The main hold-up was arguments over funding between the administrative counties of Lincolnshire, Cambridgeshire and the Department for Transport, exacerbated by the actions of a former Leader of Lincolnshire County Council who went to jail for seeking to influence the route to his own financial advantage. Eventually a route was agreed, avoiding Cowbit and Crowland and joining the A47 west of Eye, and in 2008 construction work began, originally due to be completed by Autumn 2010.

The Northern  of the new route opened between Spalding and the roundabout south of Crowland in Autumn 2010, with the opening of the Southern  delayed due to structural problems at the embankment at Car Dyke Bridge. On completion of remedial repairs and the opening of the Southern portion on 16 October 2011, the new road was renumbered to form part of the A16; the original A1073 alignment between Spalding and Eye Green became an unclassified local road.

References

External links

 Partney Bypass opens.
 Boston Bypass Pressure Group.
 Lincolnshire Police drop off member of public by the A16 who then dies from hypothermia walking home.
 Park and Ride site at Stickney.
 The Daily Telegraph, Great drives: The A16 from Stamford to Grimsby and Cleethorpes

Boston, Lincolnshire
East Lindsey District
Louth, Lincolnshire
Borough of North East Lincolnshire
Roads in Cambridgeshire
Roads in England
Roads in Lincolnshire
South Holland, Lincolnshire
Spalding, Lincolnshire
Transport in Peterborough